Hjelde is a surname. Notable people with the surname include:

Haakon Baardsøn Hjelde (born 1941), Norwegian diplomat
Jon Olav Hjelde (born 1972), Norwegian footballer
Leo Hjelde (born 2003), Norwegian footballer 

Norwegian-language surnames